The Cochran Grange, also known as John P. Cochran House, is a historic home located in Middletown, Delaware, United States. It was built between 1842 and 1845, and consists of a two-story, five bay, main block with a two-story wing. The design is influenced by the Greek Revival, Italianate, and Georgian styles. The house features a two-story porch supported by Doric order columns and a flat roof surmounted by a square cupola. Cochran Grange was the home of John P. Cochran, 43rd Governor of Delaware (1875–1879).

It was listed on the National Register of Historic Places in 1973.

Gallery

References

External links

Historic American Buildings Survey in Delaware
Houses on the National Register of Historic Places in Delaware
Georgian architecture in Delaware
Italianate architecture in Delaware
Greek Revival houses in Delaware
Houses completed in 1845
Houses in New Castle County, Delaware
National Register of Historic Places in New Castle County, Delaware